Vito Grieco (born 6 February 1971) is an Italian professional football manager and former player.

Playing career
Born in Molfetta, the Province of Bari, Grieco started his career at Baris. He then played over 100 matches at Serie B, over 150 matches at Serie C1 and over 200 matches at Serie C2.

He won Serie B runner-up in 2002 with Modena, but he was not in the Modena plan in Serie A and sold him to Calcio Catania.

Coaching career
On 24 October 2019 he was dismissed by Sicula Leonzio following 4 losses in 5 games. On 13 January 2020, he was hired by Sicula Leonzio once again. The club was dissolved at the end of the 2019–20 season.

Honours
Serie C1: 2000, 2001, 2006
Serie C2: 2008

References

External links
Profile at Football.it 
Profile at Spezia 
Profile at La Gazzetta dello Sport 

1971 births
Living people
People from Molfetta
Italian footballers
S.S.C. Bari players
F.C. Crotone players
Modena F.C. players
Catania S.S.D. players
Spezia Calcio players
A.C. Reggiana 1919 players
Serie B players
Serie C players
Association football midfielders
Italian football managers
F.C. Pro Vercelli 1892 managers
Serie B managers
Serie C managers
Footballers from Apulia
Sportspeople from the Metropolitan City of Bari